Epidendrum dendrobioides is a species of orchid in the genus Epidendrum.

The name means that this Epidendrum (Greek for "upon a tree") resembles a Dendrobium (Greek for "tree grower"). This sympodial  "tree grower"  grows terrestrially in central Brazil, at altitudes of 600–900 m. Its stem can grow to 0.4 m tall.  The coriaceous leaves are sessile, arising from clasping sheathes which cover the stem.  The congested paniculate inflorescence arises from the apex of the stem and bears small, fleshy yellow flowers.

References

External links 

dendrobioides
Endemic orchids of Brazil